Mary Campbell, Countess of Argyll (1628 – May 1668), formerly Lady Mary Stuart (or Stewart), was the wife of Archibald Campbell, 9th Earl of Argyll.

Lady Mary was born at Darnaway Castle, Elginshire, a daughter of James Stuart, 4th Earl of Moray, and his wife Margaret Home. On 13 May 1650, she married the future earl, then known as Lord Lorne, at Canongate, Edinburgh.

Their children were:

Archibald Campbell, 1st Duke of Argyll (1658-1703)
John Campbell of Mamore (c.1660-1729), Commissioner for Argyllshire, and later MP for Dunbartonshire, who married Elizabeth Elphinstone and had children
Charles Campbell, Commissioner for Campbeltown, who married twice: first, to Sophia Lindsay and second, to Betty Bowles, and had children 
James Campbell (c.1660–1713?), whose marriage to Mary Wharton was annulled; he subsequently married Margaret Leslie and had children
Mary Campbell Died as an infant 1657.
Anne Campbell (died 1734), who was married twice: first to Richard Maitland, 4th Earl of Lauderdale, and second, to Charles Stuart, 6th Earl of Moray, but had no children
Jean (or Jane) Campbell (died 1712), who married William Kerr, 2nd Marquess of Lothian, and had children

In 1663, Lord Lorne regained the title and estates which his father had lost when he was convicted of treason and executed in 1661. Lorne became Earl of Argyll, and his wife became countess.

The countess's death left her husband in despair, as his private letters testify. Her uncle, John Maitland, 1st Earl of Lauderdale, also recorded his distress and that of his wife.

Two years after her death, the earl married Anna Mackenzie. In 1685 he was executed for instigating a rising against King James VII of Scotland on behalf of the Protestant claimant James, Duke of Monmouth.

References

1628 births
1668 deaths
Scottish countesses
Daughters of Scottish earls